Turikatuku  (c. 1773–1827) was a notable New Zealand Māori tribal leader who was the wife of Hongi Hika, who accompanied him during the Musket Wars.

Biography 
Turikatuku was the daughter of Mutunga II, and belonged to Te Hikutū and Ngāti Rēhia, who were related to Ngāpuhi; their territories stretched north from Te Puna and Rangihoua in the Bay of Islands towards Whangaroa.

She and her younger sister, Tangiwhare, became wives of Hongi Hika and she travelled everywhere with him, including during campaigns. Turikatuku was Hongi's senior wife, and the mother of at least two of his children, a son named Hāre Hongi, and Rongo, later given the Christian name of Hariata, who was to become the wife first of Hōne Heke and then of Ārama Karaka Pī. About 1816, Turikatuku had inflammation of the eyes which made her completely blind, but she did not allow the impairment to prevent her from carrying out her usual tasks.

Turikatuku accompanied Hongi on his three great expeditions against tribes in the Coromandel and Hauraki Gulf, Waikato and Bay of Plenty, between 1821 and 1823.

During a campaign against the Ngāti Whātua in 1825, at the Battle of Te Ika-ā-ranganui, Turikatuku gave a speech to encourage the warriors. During the battle, her son Hāre Hongi was killed. Ngāpuhi won a complete victory greatly expanding their territory.

During a campaign against Ngāti Pou, Turikatuku became ill and died around January 1827 and was buried at Whangaroa.

References

1827 deaths
Ngāpuhi people
Blind politicians
Year of birth unknown
Māori tribal leaders
Musket Wars
Year of birth uncertain
New Zealand blind people